Philip Syng Physick (July 7, 1768 – December 15, 1837) was an American physician and professor born in Philadelphia.

Life and career
Dr. Physick was born in Philadelphia on July 7, 1768, to Edmund and Abigail Syng Physick.

Physick graduated from the University of Pennsylvania in 1785, then began the study of medicine under Adam Kuhn, and continued it in London under John Hunter, becoming, on January 1, 1790, house surgeon of St. George's hospital. In 1791 he received his license from the Royal College of Surgeons in London, and was invited by Hunter to assist him in his professional practice, but after a few months went to the University of Edinburgh, where he received his degree in medicine in 1792.

He returned to Philadelphia to practice, taking a position at Pennsylvania Hospital. One of the foremost surgeons of the time, Physick was among the few doctors who remained in the city to care for the sick during Philadelphia's decimating Yellow Fever Epidemic of 1793. In 1795, Physick performed the first human blood transfusion, though he did not publish the information.

In 1802, Physick was elected a member of the American Philosophical Society, held in Philadelphia.

Physick pioneered the use of the stomach pump, used autopsy as a regular means of observation and discovery, excelled in cataract surgery, and was responsible for the design of a number of surgical instruments, such as the needle forceps, the guillotine/snare for performing tonsillectomies, and improved splints and traction devices for treatment of dislocations; he also innovated many operative techniques. Physick was the first in Western medicine to introduce cataract extraction by aspiration of lens material by applying suction to a tube in 1815.

Physick was one of the most sought-after medical lecturers of the 19th century. His lectures prepared a generation of surgeons for service throughout America. It is because of his status as a teacher that he was dubbed the "Father of American Surgery".

His many patients included James Madison's wife, Dolley Madison, Chief Justice John Marshall (from whom he removed more than 1,000 kidney stones, effecting a complete cure), and Benjamin Rush. When President Andrew Jackson consulted with Physick about his lung hemorrhages, he was told to stop smoking.

Physick died in Philadelphia and was interred at Christ Church Burial Ground.

See also
Hill-Physick-Keith House
Randolph House (Laurel Hill Mansion)

References
Notes

External links

Biography at the University of Pennsylvania

1768 births
1837 deaths
American surgeons
Physicians from Philadelphia
University of Pennsylvania alumni
Alumni of the University of Edinburgh
18th-century American physicians
19th-century American people
Burials at Christ Church, Philadelphia

18th-century surgeons